Pol Beh Bala Rural District is a rural district (dehestan) in Simakan District, Jahrom County, Fars Province, Iran. At the 2006 census, its population was 6,718, in 1,459 families.  The rural district has 9 villages.

References 

Rural Districts of Fars Province
Jahrom County